Montenegrin municipal elections were held in 1990.

Results

External links 
 Centre for Monitoring (CeMi): Results of the municipal elections 1990

1990 elections in Yugoslavia
1990
1990 in Montenegro